Denny Place, at 217 Lexington St. in Lancaster, Kentucky, is a historic house built in 1899.  It was listed on the National Register of Historic Places in 1984.

It is a two-story four bay brick and wood shingle house with a high hipped roof.  It has overhanging eaves supported by decorative brackets.  It the only brick Queen Anne style house remaining in Lancaster.

It was built for Samuel Cabell Denny.  Denny was cashier of the National Bank of Lancaster for 30 years, then president for 10 years.  His wife survived him and lived in the house until 1966.

References

National Register of Historic Places in Garrard County, Kentucky
Queen Anne architecture in Kentucky
Houses completed in 1899
Houses in Garrard County, Kentucky
Lancaster, Kentucky
Houses on the National Register of Historic Places in Kentucky
1899 establishments in Kentucky